Hessian is a binary Web service protocol that makes Web services usable without requiring a large framework, and without learning a new set of protocols . Because it is a binary protocol, it is well-suited to sending binary data without any need to extend the protocol with attachments.

Hessian was developed by Caucho Technology, Inc. The company has released  Java, Python and  ActionScript for Adobe Flash implementations of Hessian under an open source license (the Apache license). Third-party implementations in several other languages (C++, C#, JavaScript, Perl, PHP, Ruby, Objective-C, D, and Erlang) are also available as open-source.

Adaptations
Although Hessian is primarily intended for Web services, it can be adapted for TCP traffic by using the HessianInput and HessianOutput classes in Caucho's Java implementation.

Implementations
 Cotton (Erlang)
 HessDroid (Android)
 Hessian (on Rubyforge) (Ruby)
 Hessian.js (JavaScript)
 Hessian4J (Java)
 HessianC# (C#)
 HessianCPP (C++)
 HessianD (D)
 HessianKit (Objective-C 2.0)
 HessianObjC (Objective-C)
 HessianPHP (PHP)
 HessianPy (Python)
 HessianRuby (Ruby)
 Hessian-Translator (Perl)

See also

 Abstract Syntax Notation One
 SDXF
 Apache Thrift
 Etch (protocol)
 Protocol Buffers
 Internet Communications Engine

References

External links

Web services